Ankara Atatürk High School, is an Anatolian High School located near Sıhhiye district of Çankaya, Ankara.

History 
Ankara Atatürk Lisesi was first established in 1886 as Ankara İdadisi. The school changed its name several times throughout its history: it was known as Ankara İdadisi (1886–1908), Ankara Sultanisi (1908–24), Ankara Erkek Lisesi (1924–38), and Ankara Atatürk Lisesi (1938–present). It is also known by the name "Taş Mektep".

The school was rebuilt in 1937–38 by the German architects Bruno Taut and Franz Hillinger.

The high school selects its students with the High School Entry System(LGS).

Alumni 
The high school is considered by the local press as an alma mater of Turkish leaders.

Among its alumni are:

 Sinan Çetin (film director and producer)
 Can Dündar (journalist)
 Altan Öymen, Hikmet Çetin (politicians) 
 Orhan Veli, Can Yücel (poets)
 Aydın Sayılı, Gazi Yaşargil, İlber Ortaylı, Korkut Yaltkaya (academicians)

References

External links 
 

Educational institutions established in 1886
High schools in Ankara
1886 establishments in the Ottoman Empire
Things named after Mustafa Kemal Atatürk